William was a BBC television series based on the Just William series of books written by Richmal Crompton. It ran for two series from 1962 to 1963.  12 episodes were made in all, each of half an hour long. It was filmed in black and white.

All episodes were believed to have been wiped by the BBC, but in 2016 the British Film Institute announced it had recovered the second episode of the first series, William And The Leopard Hunter. All eleven other episodes of the comedy were listed as missing.

Cast
 Dennis Waterman as William Brown in the first series
 Dennis Gilmore as William Brown in the second series
 Christopher Witty as Ginger

References

External links 
 

BBC children's television shows
British television shows based on children's books
1962 British television series debuts
1963 British television series endings
1960s British children's television series
Just William